A vehicle dweller, or car dweller, is a person who lives out of a car or other vehicle. Vehicle dwellers are considered to be homeless persons in most parts of the United States. Although technically, they are not homeless, since the very definition of a home is a permanent place where one lives. Many vehicle dwellers are forced by necessity to live out of their vehicle, although some do so as a lifestyle choice, as in the case of some van dwellers.

Sometimes a car dweller is known as a car sleeper.

In popular culture
Actor Chris Farley's character Matt Foley would often use the quote "living in a van down by the river" in Saturday Night Live sketches.

References

Homelessness in the United States
Portable buildings and shelters
Car culture
Itinerant living
Recreational vehicles